Master Muhammad Ibrahim was a Sindhi-language classical singer.

Early life and career
Muhammad Ibrahim was born on 13 June 1920 in Siliya village in the Kutch district of Gujarat, British India.
He migrated to Karachi from a village near Siliya in Gujarat, British India in 1942 at the age of 21.

He joined Radio Pakistan Karachi in 1948. Later in 1955, he moved to Radio Pakistan Hyderabad as a music composer.

It is said that Ustad Manzoor Ali Khan, Ustad Muhammad Juman and Master Muhammad Ibrahim revolutionized Sindhi music in the early days after the independence of Pakistan in 1947 by setting new trends and styles.

In 2016, on his 39th death anniversary, an event was arranged at the Arts Council of Pakistan in Karachi to pay tributes to him. His son claimed at this event that Master Muhammad Ibrahim was one of the singers that sang the first national anthem ever recorded in Pakistan.

Awards and recognition
He was awarded Shah Latif Award posthumously in 2007 (30 years after his death).

References

1920 births
1977 deaths
Sindhi-language singers
Pakistani people of Gujarati descent
20th-century Pakistani male singers
Recipients of Latif Award
Pakistani folk singers